The Born–Mayer equation is an equation that is used to calculate the lattice energy of a crystalline ionic compound. It is a refinement of the Born–Landé equation by using an improved repulsion term.

where:
NA =  Avogadro constant;
M = Madelung constant, relating to the geometry of the crystal;
z+ = charge number of cation
z− = charge number of anion
e = elementary charge, 1.6022 C
ε0 = permittivity of free space
4ε0 = 1.112 C2/(J·m)
r0 = distance to closest ion
ρ = a constant dependent on the compressibility of the crystal; 30 pm works well for all alkali metal halides

See also
Born–Landé equation
Kapustinskii equation

References

Solid-state chemistry
Ions